General elections were held in the Bahamas on 10 June 1982. The result was a victory for the Progressive Liberal Party, which won 32 of the 43 seats.

Results

References

Bahamas
1982 in the Bahamas
Elections in the Bahamas
Bahamas
Election and referendum articles with incomplete results